The Yidan Prize (/i:dan/) is a prize founded in 2016 by Chen Yidan for "contributions to education research and development". The prize is financed and governed by a HK$2.5 billion (about US$320 million) independent trust. It is a global, inclusive education award which recognizes changemakers who inspire progress in education for a better world, and has been referred to as the largest education prize on earth.

Laureates

2017 
The first prize winners were named in September 2017 as Carol S. Dweck and Vicky Colbert. The award ceremony took place during December 2017 in Hong Kong.

2018 
The two 2018 winners were Anant Agarwal and Larry Hedges.

2019 
Usha Goswami and Sir Fazle Hasan.

2020 
The American physicist Carl Wieman was awarded the prize for his work in STEM education and for his research-based improvements to university teaching and the transformation of how science is taught in major universities. When awarded the prize, Wieman stated:

I am thrilled and honored to have the work of my research group recognized in this way. This prize will accelerate our efforts to improve education for students throughout the world.

Lucy Lake and Angeline Murimirwa from Camfed, a Non-governmental organization (NGO) that seeks to eradicate poverty in Africa through the education of girls and the empowerment of young women, were awarded the prize for their contributions to education for girls and education development in Sub-Saharan Africa. Lucy Lake, CEO of the NGO stated:

This Prize brings a spotlight to the power of our growing movement led by young women who are the experts on what it takes for the most marginalized girls to succeed. Together, we will launch our ambition to support five million girls in school, and it will be game-changing

2021 
The prize for Education Research was awarded to  Eric A. Hanushek, the Paul and Jean Hanna Senior Fellow at the Hoover Institution of Stanford University, while the prize for Education Development was awarded to Dr. Rukmini Banerji, CEO of Pratham Education Foundation.

2022 
Linda Darling-Hammond and Yongxin Zhu.

Prizes 
The Yidan Prizes consist of a medal, a cash prize of HK$15 million and a project fund of HK$15 million to each of the two winners. It is supported by a US$320 million endowment.  Prizes are awarded at the annual Yidan Prize Awards Presentation Ceremony in conjunction with an education conference.

Adjudication process 
Nominations may be submitted by universities, government agencies, and think tanks and are reviewed by a committee involving Kōichirō Matsuura, Andreas Schleicher and Dorothy Gordon.

Worldwide 'Educating for the Future' Index 
In 2017 the Yidan Prize Foundation released a "Worldwide 'Educating for the Future' Index" (researched by the Economist Intelligence Unit) comparing the education in 35 developed and developing economies (ranking by 16 indicators of education policy, "teaching environment" and "socio-economic environment"), placing New Zealand and Canada in the top two places.

References

External links                                                                                                                                  
 

Academic awards
International educational charities
Education events
Educational foundations
Child education organizations
2016 establishments in Hong Kong
Awards established in 2016